Anatoma conica is a species of minute sea snail, a marine gastropod mollusk or micromollusk in the family Anatomidae.

References

External links
 To Antarctic Invertebrates
 To Encyclopedia of Life
 To USNM Invertebrate Zoology Mollusca Collection
 To World Register of Marine Species

Anatomidae
Gastropods described in 1841